The Ontario Fault Determination Rules (commonly known as the Fault Rules or FDR) is a regulation under the Ontario Insurance Act enacted by the Parliament of Ontario to judge driver responsibility after car accidents in Ontario. The Fault Rules say which driver was responsible for an accident. Accidents are either 0%, 25%, 50%, 75%, or 100% at fault. If the driver is from Ontario, the portion not at fault percentage is covered under Ontario's mandatory to buy Direct Compensation insurance, and the at fault portion is covered under the optional to buy Collision insurance.

A fault rating between 50–100% might affect the driver's and insurance policyholder's future risk factor and therefore future insurance rates. Note auto claim's using Specified Perils/Comprehensive for events like theft, vandalism, or hail damage are not subject to a fault rule (but may affect insurance rates and coverage depending on policyholder's claim history).

The Fault Rules are for most every accident in Ontario. However, under some rare conditions the Fault Rules do not apply and accident responsibility is determined by car accident case law. Car accidents outside of Ontario are governed by the Provincial or State where it happened. Each respective regulation is similar to these Fault Rules, but differences do exist, see the correct jurisdiction's fault rules for their details.

Basic Rules 

The Fault Rules have several basic conditions. These conditions specify that insurance companies have to use them when determining fault, and that circumstances like weather or road conditions do not matter when determining which driver was responsible.

The conditions are:

Evidence 

Determining car accident fault requires knowing what happened at the accident. Re-creating an accident can be difficult. To deal with this most fault rules have a version for knowing the details of the accident, and not knowing (ex. accidents in the middle of an all-way stop).

The following are the ways accident details are collected.

Driver accounts to either an insurance adjuster or police officer.
Independent witnesses.
On site police reports (if the police say for sure what happened).
Dashboard camera video.

How much at fault 

A car accident can have one or several Fault Rules that apply. If an accident has only one Fault Rule, then the one rule's rating puts each driver 0–100% at fault.

If there are several rules that apply then the rules below apply too.

{| class="wikitable"
! style="text-align: center; | Rule
! style="text-align: center; | Section
|-
| style="text-align: center;" | If multiple rules apply to an insured person, then the one that gives the least fault is used.
| style="text-align: center;" | 4.1
|-
| style="text-align: center;" | However, despite 4.1, if each insured driver breaks a fault rule so each driver is both 0% at fault, and 100% at fault, then each driver is 50% at fault
| style="text-align: center;" | 4.2
|-
|}

What if no Fault Rule applies 

There are some rare accidents when no fault rule can apply.

If that happens then these rules apply:

{| class="wikitable"
! style="text-align: center; | Rule
! style="text-align: center; | Section
|-
| style="text-align: center;" | If an incident is not described in any of the Fault Rules, then an insured driver is judged according to the ordinary rules of the road (case law).
| style="text-align: center;" | 5.1
|-
| style="text-align: center;" | If there isn't enough information to know what happened, then the insured driver is judged according to the case law.
| style="text-align: center;" | 5.2
|}

The Fault Rules 

The below sections are the actual Fault Rules. Each is divided into sections describing where the two (or more) cars are relative to each other.

Rear End

Rule 6.2 

{| class="wikitable"
! style="text-align: center; | Rule
! style="text-align: center; |"A"
! style="text-align: center; |"B"
! style="text-align: center; | Section
|-
| style="text-align: center;" | If driver "A" is stopped or in forward motion, and is rear ended by driver "B".
| 0%
| 100%
| style="text-align: center;" | 6.2
|}

Rule 6.3 

{| class="wikitable"
! style="text-align: center; | Rule
! style="text-align: center; |"A"
! style="text-align: center; |"B"
! style="text-align: center; | Section
|-
| style="text-align: center;" | If "A" is turning, either right or left, to enter a private road or driveway.
| 0%
| 100%
| style="text-align: center;" | 6.3
|}

Rule 6.4 

{| class="wikitable"
! style="text-align: center; | Rule
! style="text-align: center; |"A"
! style="text-align: center; |"B"
! style="text-align: center; | Section
|-
| style="text-align: center;" | If "A" is going forward, and entering a road side parking place.
| 0%
| 100%
| style="text-align: center;" | 6.4
|}

Entering a roadway

Rule 7.2 

{| class="wikitable"
! style="text-align: center; | Rule
! style="text-align: center; |"A"
! style="text-align: center; |"B"
! style="text-align: center; | Section
|-
| style="text-align: center;" | If accident happens when "B" is leaving a parking place while "A" is passing it.
| 0%
| 100%
| style="text-align: center;" | 7.2
|}

Rule 7.3 

{| class="wikitable"
! style="text-align: center; | Rule
! style="text-align: center; |"A"
! style="text-align: center; |"B"
! style="text-align: center; | Section
|-
| style="text-align: center;" | If accident happens when "B" entering the roadway from a private road or driveway "A" is passing it, and there are no traffic controls.
| 0%
| 100%
| style="text-align: center;" | 7.3
|}

Entering from On Ramp

Rule 8 

{| class="wikitable"
! style="text-align: center; | Rule
! style="text-align: center; |"A"
! style="text-align: center; |"B"
! style="text-align: center; | Section
|-
| style="text-align: center;" | If accident happens when "B" entering the roadway from an on-ramp.
| 0%
| 100%
| style="text-align: center;" | 8.0
|}

Multi Car Rear End - Chain Reaction

Rule 9.3 a-b 

{| class="wikitable"
! style="text-align: center; | Rule
! style="text-align: center; |"A"
! style="text-align: center; |"B"
! style="text-align: center; |"C"
! style="text-align: center; | Section
|-
| style="text-align: center;" | If all vehicles are in motion, and "A" is lead, "B" is middle and "C" is last.
| style="text-align: center;" | n/a
| style="text-align: center;" | n/a
| style="text-align: center;" | n/a
| style="text-align: center;" | 9.3
|-
| style="text-align: center;" | In collision between "A" and "B".
| style="text-align: center;" | 0%
| style="text-align: center;" | 50%
| style="text-align: center;" | n/a
| style="text-align: center;" | 9.3.a
|-
| style="text-align: center;" | In collision between "B" and "C".
| n/a
| 0%
| 100%
| style="text-align: center;" | 9.3.b
|}

Rule 9.4 a-b 

{| class="wikitable"
! style="text-align: center; | Rule
! style="text-align: center; |"A"
! style="text-align: center; |"B"
! style="text-align: center; |"C"
! style="text-align: center; | Section
|-
| style="text-align: center;" | If only "C" vehicle is in motion when collision happens
| style="text-align: center;" | n/a
| style="text-align: center;" | n/a
| style="text-align: center;" | n/a
| style="text-align: center;" | 9.4
|-
| style="text-align: center;" | In collision between "A" and "B".
| style="text-align: center;" | 0%
| style="text-align: center;" | 0%
| style="text-align: center;" | n/a
| style="text-align: center;" | 9.4.a
|-
| style="text-align: center;" | In collision between "B" and "C".
| n/a
| 0%
| 100%
| style="text-align: center;" | 9.4.b
|-
|}

Sideswipes

Rule 10.2 

{| class="wikitable"
! style="text-align: center; | Rule
! style="text-align: center; | "A"
! style="text-align: center; | "B"
! style="text-align: center; | Section
|-
| style="text-align: center;" | If neither "A" or "B" change lanes, and both are on or over the centre line when sideswipe happens.
| style="text-align: center;" | 50%
| style="text-align: center;" | 50%
| style="text-align: center;" | 10.2
|}

Rule 10.3 

{| class="wikitable"
! style="text-align: center; | Rule
! style="text-align: center; | "A"
! style="text-align: center; | "B"
! style="text-align: center; | Section
|-
| style="text-align: center;" | If the location of "A" or "B" cannot be confirmed when sideswipe happens.
| style="text-align: center;" | 50%
| style="text-align: center;" | 50%
| style="text-align: center;" | 10.3
|}

Rule 10.4 

{| class="wikitable"
! style="text-align: center; | Rule
! style="text-align: center; | "A"
! style="text-align: center; | "B"
! style="text-align: center; | Section
|-
| style="text-align: center;" | If the collision happens when "B" is changing lanes.
| style="text-align: center;" | 0%
| style="text-align: center;" | 100%
| style="text-align: center;" | 10.4
|}

Rule 10.5 

{| class="wikitable"
! style="text-align: center; | Rule
! style="text-align: center; | "A"
! style="text-align: center; | "B"
! style="text-align: center; | Section
|-
| style="text-align: center;" | If the collision happens when "A" is turning left at an intersection and "B" is overtaking "A" to pass it.
| style="text-align: center;" | 25%
| style="text-align: center;" | 75%
| style="text-align: center;" | 10.5
|}

Rule 10.6 

{| class="wikitable"
! style="text-align: center; | Rule
! style="text-align: center; | "A"
! style="text-align: center; | "B"
! style="text-align: center; | Section
|-
| style="text-align: center;" | If the collision happens when "A" is turning left at a private road or driveway and "B" is overtaking "A" to pass it.
| style="text-align: center;" | 50%
| style="text-align: center;" | 50%
| style="text-align: center;" | 10.6
|}

Rule 10.7 

{| class="wikitable"
! style="text-align: center; | Rule
! style="text-align: center; | "A"
! style="text-align: center; | "B"
! style="text-align: center; | Section
|-
| style="text-align: center;" | If the collision happens when "A" is turning left at a private road or driveway and "B" is passing several other cars stopped behind "A" to pass it.
| style="text-align: center;" | 0%
| style="text-align: center;" | 100%
| style="text-align: center;" | 10.7
|}

Pile Ups

Rule 11.2 

{| class="wikitable"
! style="text-align: center; | Rule
! style="text-align: center; | "A"
! style="text-align: center; | "B"
! style="text-align: center; | "C"
! style="text-align: center; | Section
|-
| style="text-align: center;" | For each collision between two automobiles involved in a pile-up.
| style="text-align: center;" | 50%
| style="text-align: center;" | 50%
| style="text-align: center;" | 50%
| style="text-align: center;" | 11.2
|}

IMAGE

Sideswipe - Opposite Directions

Rule 12.2 

{| class="wikitable"
! style="text-align: center; | Rule
! style="text-align: center; | "A"
! style="text-align: center; | "B"
! style="text-align: center; | Section
|-
| style="text-align: center;" | If neither "A" or "B" changes lanes and both are on or over the centre lane when sideswipe happens.
| style="text-align: center;" | 50%
| style="text-align: center;" | 50%
| style="text-align: center;" | 12.2
|}

Rule 12.3 

{| class="wikitable"
! style="text-align: center; | Rule
! style="text-align: center; | "A"
! style="text-align: center; | "B"
! style="text-align: center; | Section
|-
| style="text-align: center;" | If the location of "A" and "B"cannot be determined when the sideswipe happens
| style="text-align: center;" | 50%
| style="text-align: center;" | 50%
| style="text-align: center;" | 12.3
|}

Rule 12.4 

{| class="wikitable"
! style="text-align: center; | Rule
! style="text-align: center; | "A"
! style="text-align: center; | "B"
! style="text-align: center; | Section
|-
| style="text-align: center;" | If the automobile "B"is over the centre line when the collision happens.
| style="text-align: center;" | 0%
| style="text-align: center;" | 100%
| style="text-align: center;" | 12.4
|}

Rule 12.5 

{| class="wikitable"
! style="text-align: center; | Rule
! style="text-align: center; | "A"
! style="text-align: center; | "B"
! style="text-align: center; | Section
|-
| style="text-align: center;" | If the automobile "B"turns left into the path of "A"
| style="text-align: center;" | 0%
| style="text-align: center;" | 100%
| style="text-align: center;" | 12.5
|}

 ::

Rule 12.6 

{| class="wikitable"
! style="text-align: center; | Rule
! style="text-align: center; | "A"
! style="text-align: center; | "B"
! style="text-align: center; | Section
|-
| style="text-align: center;" | If the automobile "B"is leaving a parking place or is entering the road from a private road or driveway, and "A" is overtaking to pass another vehicle when the collision happens.
| style="text-align: center;" | 0%
| style="text-align: center;" | 100%
| style="text-align: center;" | 12.6
|}

Intersection with no traffic controls

Rule 13.2 

{| class="wikitable"
! style="text-align: center; font-weight: bold;" | Rule
! style="text-align: center; | "A"
! style="text-align: center; | "B"
! style="text-align: center; font-weight: bold;" | Section
|-
| style="text-align: center;" | If the automobile "A" enters the intersection first.
| style="text-align: center;" | 0%
| style="text-align: center;" | 100%
| style="text-align: center;" | 13.2
|}

Rule 13.3 

{| class="wikitable"
! style="text-align: center; font-weight: bold;" | Rule
! style="text-align: center; | "A"
! style="text-align: center; | "B"
! style="text-align: center; font-weight: bold;" | Section
|-
| style="text-align: center;" | If automobile "A" and "B" enter at the same time, and "A" is to the right.
| style="text-align: center;" | 0%
| style="text-align: center;" | 100%
| style="text-align: center;" | 13.3
|}

Rule 13.4 

{| class="wikitable"
! style="text-align: center; font-weight: bold;" | Rule
! style="text-align: center; | "A"
! style="text-align: center; | "B"
! style="text-align: center; font-weight: bold;" | Section
|-
| style="text-align: center;" | If it can't be established who entered the intersection first.
| style="text-align: center;" | 50%
| style="text-align: center;" | 50%
| style="text-align: center;" | 13.4
|}

Intersection with traffic signs

Rule 14.2 

{| class="wikitable"
! style="text-align: center; | Rule
! style="text-align: center; | "A"
! style="text-align: center; | "B"
! style="text-align: center; | Section
|-
| style="text-align: center;" | If collision happens because automobile "B" doesn't obey the stop sign.
| style="text-align: center;" | 0%
| style="text-align: center;" | 100%
| style="text-align: center;" | 14.2
|}

Rule 14.3 

{| class="wikitable"
! style="text-align: center; | Rule
! style="text-align: center; | "A"
! style="text-align: center; | "B"
! style="text-align: center; | Section
|-
| style="text-align: center;" | If "A" and "B" both fail to obey the stop sign.
| style="text-align: center;" | 50%
| style="text-align: center;" | 50%
| style="text-align: center;" | 14.3
|}

Rule 14.4 

{| class="wikitable"
! style="text-align: center; | Rule
! style="text-align: center; | "A"
! style="text-align: center; | "B"
! style="text-align: center; | Section
|-
| style="text-align: center;" | If it cannot be established who didn't stop at the stop sign.
| style="text-align: center;" | 50%
| style="text-align: center;" | 50%
| style="text-align: center;" | 14.4
|}

Rule 14.5 

{| class="wikitable"
! style="text-align: center; | Rule
! style="text-align: center; | "A"
! style="text-align: center; | "B"
! style="text-align: center; | Section
|-
| style="text-align: center;" | If at an all-way stop sign "A" arrives first and stops.
| style="text-align: center;" | 0%
| style="text-align: center;" | 100%
| style="text-align: center;" | 14.5
|}

Rule 14.6 

{| class="wikitable"
! style="text-align: center; | Rule
! style="text-align: center; | "A"
! style="text-align: center; | "B"
! style="text-align: center; | Section
|-
| style="text-align: center;" | If at an all-way stop sign "A" and "B" arrive at the same time and stop, but "A" is to the right.
| style="text-align: center;" | 0%
| style="text-align: center;" | 100%
| style="text-align: center;" | 14.6
|}

Rule 14.7 

{| class="wikitable"
! style="text-align: center; | Rule
! style="text-align: center; | "A"
! style="text-align: center; | "B"
! style="text-align: center; | Section
|-
| style="text-align: center;" | If it cannot be established who arrived at the stop sign first.
| style="text-align: center;" | 50%
| style="text-align: center;" | 50%
| style="text-align: center;" | 14.7
|}

Intersection with traffic signals

Rule 15.2 

{| class="wikitable"
! style="text-align: center; font-weight: bold;" | Rule
! style="text-align: center; | "A"
! style="text-align: center; | "B"
! style="text-align: center; font-weight: bold;" | Section
|-
| style="text-align: center;" | If the automobile "B" fails to obey a traffic signal.
| style="text-align: center;" | 0%
| style="text-align: center;" | 100%
| style="text-align: center;" | 15.2
|}

Rule 15.3 

{| class="wikitable"
! style="text-align: center; font-weight: bold;" | Rule
! style="text-align: center; | "A"
! style="text-align: center; | "B"
! style="text-align: center; font-weight: bold;" | Section
|-
| style="text-align: center;" | If it can't be established who disobey the traffic signal.
| style="text-align: center;" | 50%
| style="text-align: center;" | 50%
| style="text-align: center;" | 15.3
|}

Rule 15.4 

{| class="wikitable"
! style="text-align: center; font-weight: bold;" | Rule
! style="text-align: center; | "A"
! style="text-align: center; | "B"
! style="text-align: center; font-weight: bold;" | Section
|-
| style="text-align: center;" | If the traffic signs don't work, then the intersection is treated like an all-way stop.
| style="text-align: center;" | n/a
| style="text-align: center;" | n/a
| style="text-align: center;" | 15.4
|}

There is no graphic for this rule.

Parking lots

Who Has Right of Way in Parking Lots

Rule 16.3 

{| class="wikitable"
! style="text-align: center; | Rule
! style="text-align: center; | "A"
! style="text-align: center; | "B"
! style="text-align: center; | Section
|-
| style="text-align: center;" | If automobile "A" is leaving a feeder lane, and doesn't yield to automobile "B" who is on a thoroughfare.
| style="text-align: center;" | 100%
| style="text-align: center;" | 0%
| style="text-align: center;" | 16.3
|}

Rule 16.4 

{| class="wikitable"
! style="text-align: center; | Rule
! style="text-align: center; | "B"
! style="text-align: center; | "A"
! style="text-align: center; | Section
|-
| style="text-align: center;" | If automobile "B" is leaving a parking space, and doesn't yield to automobile "A" who is on a feeder lane or thoroughfare.
| style="text-align: center;" | 100%
| style="text-align: center;" | 0%
| style="text-align: center;" | 16.4
|}

 ::

Parked Car

Rule 17.1 

{| class="wikitable"
! style="text-align: center; | Rule
! style="text-align: center; | "A"
! style="text-align: center; | "B"
! style="text-align: center; | Section
|-
| style="text-align: center;" | If automobile "B" is parked when hit by automobile "A".
| style="text-align: center;" | 100%
| style="text-align: center;" | 0%
| style="text-align: center;" | 17.1
|}

Rule 17.2 

{| class="wikitable"
! style="text-align: center; | Rule
! style="text-align: center; | "A"
! style="text-align: center; | "B"
! style="text-align: center; | Section
|-
| style="text-align: center;" | If automobile "A" is illegally parked, or stopped when hit by "B" and the accident happens outside a city, town, or village.
| style="text-align: center;" | 100%
| style="text-align: center;" | 0%
| style="text-align: center;" | 17.2
|}

There is no graphic for this rule.

Rule 18 a-d 

{| class="wikitable"
! style="text-align: center; | Rule
! style="text-align: center; | "A"
! style="text-align: center; | "B"
! style="text-align: center; | Section
|-
| style="text-align: center;" | If the accident happens because driver "A" fails to obey:
a. Police officer's direction.
b. Do not enter sign.
c. Do not pass sign.
d. Do not turn sign.
| style="text-align: center;" | 100%
| style="text-align: center;" | 0%
| style="text-align: center;" | 18 a-d
|}

 There are no graphics for these rules.

Rule 19 a 

{| class="wikitable"
! style="text-align: center; | Rule
! style="text-align: center; | "A"
! style="text-align: center; | "B"
! style="text-align: center; | Section
|-
| style="text-align: center;" | If driver "A" was reversing or backing up.
| style="text-align: center;" | 100%
| style="text-align: center;" | 0%
| style="text-align: center;" | 19.a
|}

Rule 19 b 

{| class="wikitable"
! style="text-align: center; | Rule
! style="text-align: center; | "A"
! style="text-align: center; | "B"
! style="text-align: center; | Section
|-
| style="text-align: center;" | If driver "A" was making a U-turn.
| style="text-align: center;" | 100%
| style="text-align: center;" | 0%
| style="text-align: center;" | 19.b
|}

Rule 19 c 

{| class="wikitable"
! style="text-align: center; | Rule
! style="text-align: center; | "A"
! style="text-align: center; | "B"
! style="text-align: center; | Section
|-
| style="text-align: center;" | If driver "A", or a passenger in "A", opens or leaves a door open.
| style="text-align: center;" | 100%
| style="text-align: center;" | 0%
| style="text-align: center;" | 19.c
|}

Driving Offences

How Driving Offences Change Fault

Notes

References 

R.R.O. 1990, Reg. 668: FAULT DETERMINATION RULES
Ontario Insurance Act
Financial Services Commission of Ontario

Ontario law
Canadian transport law